US Post Office-Hempstead is a historic post office building located at Hempstead, Nassau County, New York, United States. It was built in 1932 and designed by consulting architects Tooker & Marsh for the Office of the Supervising Architect.  It is a two-story, symmetrically massed building faced with tan, brown, and red brick in the Classical Revival style.  The central entrance features flanking octagonal aluminum Art Deco style lamps and other Art Deco ornamental detail.

The lobby features 1936 murals by Peppino Mangravite installed in 1937.

It was listed on the National Register of Historic Places in 1988.

References

External links

Hempstead
Government buildings completed in 1936
Neoclassical architecture in New York (state)
Hempstead (village), New York
National Register of Historic Places in Hempstead (town), New York
Treasury Relief Art Project